HD 143346 (HR 5595) is a single star in the southern circumpolar constellation of Apus. It is 28.5 minutes west and about 5° north of the yellow giant star Gamma Apodis, which is the second brightest star in the constellation of Apus. 

At that distance, the visual brightness of this star is diminished by an extinction of 0.174 due to interstellar dust. The star has an absolute magnitude of 0.95.

HD 1433456 has a stellar classification of K1.5III CN1, indicating a red giant that has an anomalous overabundance of cyanogen in the spectrum. It is currently on the horizontal branch, generating fusion via a helium core. At present it has 118% the mass of the Sun but has expanded to 10.6 times the radius of the Sun. HD 1433456 is a member of the Milky Way's thick disk, but is metal enriched.

References

K-type giants
Apus (constellation)
PD-72 01902
143346
078868
5955
Horizontal-branch stars
Apodis, 38